Deep Blue is a BBC Books original novel written by Mark Morris and based on the long-running British science fiction television series Doctor Who. It features the Fifth Doctor, Tegan, Turlough, and members of UNIT, mostly embodied by Captain Mike Yates.

External links

1999 British novels
1999 science fiction novels
Past Doctor Adventures
Fifth Doctor novels
Novels by Mark Morris